International Firefighters' Day (IFFD) is observed on May 4. It was instituted after a proposal was made on January 4, 1999, following the deaths of five firefighters in tragic circumstances in a bushfire in Australia.

The incident
On December 2, 1998, firefighters of the Geelong West Fire Brigade responded to a call for aid from Linton, in the Australian state of Victoria. A sudden change of wind direction led to the death in a bushfire of five Geelong West firefighters: Garry Vredeveldt, Chris Evans, Stuart Davidson, Jason Thomas, and Matthew Armstrong. This incident led to the proposal for an International Firefighters' Day.

Red/Blue Ribbon
One of the symbols of International Firefighters' Day is a red and blue lapel ribbon. This ribbon is five centimeters long and one centimeter wide, with the two separate colors conjoined at the top. The red of the ribbon represents fire while the blue represents water. The ribbon is traditionally worn on the lapel but is not limited to the lapel.

St. Florian
Saint Florian, regarded in the Catholic Church as the patron saint of firefighters, is another symbol of International Firefighters' Day. The saint's day (as observed in the Catholic Church) of St. Florian is 4 May, hence International Firefighters' Day is also observed on May 4.

Promotion of fire prevention and fire training
Fire prevention and the need for more intensive and thorough training is promoted through International Firefighters' Day, and the day is seen as an important opportunity to raise both skills and awareness.

Statistics
In 2009, ninety line of duty deaths were recorded amongst firefighters in the United States of America; forty-seven of these being volunteers, thirty-six being career firefighters, and seven being part of a wild land agency. In 2009, sixteen firefighters died fighting wild land fires (which is how the five firefighters from Linton died). In 2009, a total of 3,010 civilians died in fires. There were a calculated 1.3 million fires in 2009 which resulted in $12.5 billion in direct property loss. In 2009, there were also a total of 78,792 wildfires which burned an estimated  .

Firefighter and support workers service
Even though International Firefighters' Day commemorates those who have died in the line of duty, the day also marks lifetime service given both by firefighters and by all those who support fire emergency services.

See also
Firefighting
Women in firefighting

References

 Diamantes, David. Fire Prevention: Inspection and Code Enforcement. 3rd ed. Cliffton Park, NY: Thomson Delmar Learning, 2007. Print
 Facts About Wind and Wildfires. The Weather Channel Interactive, Inc, 2010. Web. 15 October 2010.
 International Firefighters’ Day. IFFD.NET, 2006. Web. 15 October 2010.
 Klinoff, Robert. Introduction to Fire Protection. 3rd ed. Cliffton Park, NY: Delmar Cengage Learning, 2007. Print.
 The Origins of International Firefighters’ Day. Newcastle Events, 2010. Web. 15 October 2010.
 United States. U.S. Fire Administration. Fire Statistics. Sept 2010. U.S. Fire Administration. Web. 15 October 2010.

External links
 IFFD site

Fire service awards and honors
Firefighting
International observances
May observances